Beach House in Worthing, England is a Regency beach-side villa, built in 1820 to designs by John Rebecca.  It was originally known as Marino Mansion.

History
In the mid-nineteenth century, Sir Frederick Adair Roe, Chief Magistrate of the Bow Street office and head of the Bow Street Runners, London's police force, owned and lived in Beach House.

Sir Robert Loder, Conservative Member of Parliament for New Shoreham, lived at Beach House until his death in 1888.  His wife, Lady Maria Georgiana Loder and his eldest son Sir Edmund Loder continued to live at Beach House after Sir Robert's death.

Between 1907 and 1910 King Edward VII stayed at the house several times while visiting Sir Edmund Loder and his family.

In 1917, playwright Edward Knoblock bought the house.  His visitors included Arnold Bennett, J. B. Priestley, and Sir Compton Mackenzie.  Knoblock refurbished the interior and forecourt of the property to the designs of Scottish architect Ormrod Maxwell Ayrton, while displaying furniture from the Thomas Hope collection he had bought from a sale at Deepdene in Dorking, Surrey.

During the Spanish Civil War in 1936, Beach House was used to house children evacuated from their homes in the Basque province of Biscay.  The children were fleeing bombing and starvation after the destruction of the town of Guernica by the Nazi Luftwaffe. They were supported and cared for entirely by local volunteers.

From 1939 to 1945, during the Second World War, Beach House was used by the Air Training Corps.

Beach House is a Grade II* listed building.

The grounds
This beach-side open space surrounding the Regency building of Beach House is situated in Brighton Road and was purchased by Worthing Borough Council in December 1927 and laid out in 1937-1938.  The grounds are 2.78 acres (11265.25 sq. m) and have a playground, two tennis courts and a car park.
Beach House gives its name to nearby Beach House Park, opposite Beach House, one of the world's best-known venues for bowls.

See also

Grade II* listed buildings in West Sussex
Listed buildings in Worthing
Peter Pans Playground

References

Grade II* listed buildings in West Sussex
Buildings and structures in Worthing
Houses in West Sussex